Let Us March Forward Dynamically Towards Final Victory, Holding Higher the Banner of Songun is a speech by Kim Jong-un on 15 April 2012, given to commemorate the centenary of the birth of Kim Il-sung. It was his first major public speech after succeeding his father Kim Jong-il after his death in 2011. He had given at least one speech, Let Us Brilliantly Accomplish the Revolutionary Cause of Juche, Holding Kim Jong Il in High Esteem as the Eternal General Secretary of Our Party, to party officials the week before.

Kim delivered the speech at the Kim Il-sung Square in Pyongyang. He delivered it in 20 minutes. The speech was broadcast on North Korean television. Kim's public speech was noted for departing from the customs of his father Kim Jong-il, who spoke in public extremely rarely. A song, "Onwards Toward the Final Victory", was created on the basis of the speech.

In the speech, Kim tells officials to respect Kim Il-sung and Kim Jong-il. He makes 16 mentions of the leaders, 11 of which refer to both as if they are a single unit. The speech places heavy emphasis on the Songun (military-first) ideology. Kim says the army is tasked with safeguarding the leading Kim dynasty.


See also 

 Kim Jong-un bibliography
 Songun

Notes

References

Works cited

Further reading 
 

Kim Jong-un
2012 in North Korea
2012 speeches